Route 76 or Highway 76 may refer to:

International
 Asian Highway 76
 European route E76

Afghanistan
Kabul-Mazar Highway (A76)

Australia
 Gwydir Highway

China 
  G76 Expressway

Korea, South
National Route 76

Mexico
 Mexican Federal Highway 76

Netherlands 

Rijksweg A76

New Zealand 
 New Zealand State Highway 76

Philippines
 N76 highway (Philippines)

United States
 Interstate 76
 U.S. Route 76
 Alabama State Route 76
 Arizona State Route 76 (former)
 Arkansas Highway 76
 Arkansas Highway 76 (1926) (former)
 California State Route 76
 Colorado State Highway 76 (1923–1976) (former)
 Florida State Road 76
 County Road 76A (Martin County, Florida)
 Georgia State Route 76
 Hawaii Route 76
 Illinois Route 76
 Iowa Highway 76
 K-76 (Kansas highway)
 Kentucky Route 76
 Louisiana Highway 76
 Louisiana State Route 76 (former)
 Maryland Route 76
 M-76 (Michigan highway) (former)
 Minnesota State Highway 76
 Mississippi Highway 76
 Missouri Route 76
 Nebraska Highway 76 (former)
 Nebraska Link 76E
 Nebraska Spur 76A
 Nebraska Spur 76C
 Nebraska Spur 76D
 Nevada State Route 76 (former)
 New Jersey Route 76 (former)
 New Jersey Route 76C
 County Route 76 (Bergen County, New Jersey)
 New Mexico State Road 76
 New York State Route 76
 County Route 76 (Cattaraugus County, New York)
 County Route 76A (Cayuga County, New York)
 County Route 76 (Madison County, New York)
 County Route 76 (Montgomery County, New York)
 County Route 76 (Niagara County, New York)
 County Route 76 (Oneida County, New York)
 County Route 76 (Orange County, New York)
 County Route 76 (Rensselaer County, New York)
 County Route 76 (Rockland County, New York)
 County Route 76 (Saratoga County, New York)
 County Route 76 (Steuben County, New York)
 County Route 76 (Suffolk County, New York)
 Ohio State Route 76 (1923-1960) (former)
 Oklahoma State Highway 76
 Pennsylvania Route 76 (former)
 Tennessee State Route 76
 Texas State Highway 76 (former; two highways)
 Texas State Highway Loop 76
 Farm to Market Road 76
 Urban Road 76 (signed as Farm to Market Road 76)
 Texas Park Road 76
 Utah State Route 76
 Virginia State Route 76
 West Virginia Route 76
 Wisconsin Highway 76
 Wyoming Highway 76

Territories
 U.S. Virgin Islands Highway 76

See also
A76 (disambiguation)